Alexander Reid (1914–1982) was a Scottish playwright and poet, "one of the neglected dramatists of the Scottish Renaissance". His two best-known plays are The Lass wi' the Muckle Mou, based on the legend of Thomas the Rhymer, and The Warld's Wander, about Michael Scot, the famous magician.

Life
Alexander Reid was born on 19 August 1914 in Edinburgh, and educated at George Heriot's School. From 1929 to 1936 he worked as a journalist for the Edinburgh Evening News, before writing on Scottish history and literature for the SMT Magazine. A conscientious objector during World War II, he worked as a bookseller and accountant before becoming a full-time writer and broadcaster in 1948. The Lass wi' the Muckle Mou was first performed at the Glasgow Citizens' Theatre in November 1950. He died in Edinburgh on 1 July 1982.

Reid edited the Saltire Society's quarterly Saltire Review from 1954 until 1960.

Published works
 Steps to a Viewpoint, 1947
 Zoo-illogical Rhymes, 1947
 The Milky Way, 1956
 Kirk and Drama, 1957
 The Lass wi' the Muckle Mou, 1958
 The Warld's Wonder, 1958
 Two Scots Plays, 1958
 The Young Traveller in France, 1963

Other plays
 The Wax Doll, 1956

References

1914 births
1982 deaths
Scottish dramatists and playwrights
20th-century British dramatists and playwrights